Plainfield Correctional Facility is a prison for men of the Indiana Department of Correction located in Plainfield, Indiana.

The facility opened in 1969 as the Indiana Youth Center.

As of 2016, the prison housed 1,659 inmates, and employed 333 staff.

Notable inmates
 Mike Tyson (assigned to the Indiana Youth Center in April 1992, released on March 25, 1995) Tyson had to serve additional time after he threatened a guard, although full details of this were not released.

References

External links

 "Plainfield Correctional Facility." Indiana Department of Correction

Prisons in Indiana
Buildings and structures in Hendricks County, Indiana
1969 establishments in Indiana